Hidden Darts: Special Edition is a compilation of rare album B-Sides, unreleased, and mixtape tracks by Ghostface Killah, an American hip-hop musician. The album features guests from the Wu-Tang Clan rap group, as well as members from Ghostface's Theodore Unit. "The Watch", "The Sun" & "Good Times" are B-Sides left over from the Bulletproof Wallets era and were shown in the track listing of the early pressings but were never on the album.

Track listing

External links
Ghostface at Def Jam
Ghostface on Myspace

Ghostface Killah albums
2007 compilation albums